William Roberton Fraser, 3rd Baron Strathalmond (born 22 July 1947) is a British hereditary peer.

He was educated at Loretto School. In 1973, he married Amanda Rose Taylor. Their son William Gordon Fraser was born in 1976.

Arms

References

1947 births
Living people
Barons in the Peerage of the United Kingdom
People educated at Loretto School, Musselburgh
Strathalmond